Abu Yahya (a.k.a. Rehan Ahmed Yousufi (born 22 September 1969) is Pakistani scholar, writer and novelist. His work mainly focus on faith and morality, Islamic philosophy and Quran exegesis. He is presenting the Quranic teachings in novel form. He is influenced by Ahmed Raza Khan Barelvi, Ashraf Ali Thanwi, Abul A'la Maududi, Syed Abuul Hassan Ali Nadvi, Amin Ahsan Islahi, Dr. Israr Ahmed, Wahiduddin Khan and Javed Ahmad Ghamidi.

Education
Abu Yahya did his Bachelors (Hons) and Masters in Islamic Studies and Computer Technology with First class First from Sheikh Zayed Islamic Centre, University of Karachi, Karachi whereas he has also completed M.Phil. in Social Sciences. He has completed his PhD in Islamic Studies. His Ph.D thesis was on the topic of ‘Evolution of Dawah Methodology Literature in 20th Century Subcontinent’

Career
Abu Yahya started his career as an IT Professional. After completing his education he worked in Saudi Arabia and Canada. In 2001 he came back to Pakistan and started his Da'wah work He has also been active in reforming the society and preaching them through television programs, newspaper articles, and public gatherings. At the beginning he associated himself with “Danish Sara Pakistan;” then in 2008 as an associate fellow, he worked for Al-Mawrid; in 2009 in the suburbs of Karachi he established a spiritual retreat (Training Center) for the reformation and moral education of the people. In 2013 Inzaar Institution was established for the above mentioned purposes. He is also an editor of the monthly magazine bearing the same name that is Inzaar.

Books
Abu Yahya wrote many books, novels and travelogues. His prominent books besides “Jab Zindagi Shuru Hogi”  are “Qasam Us Waqt Ki”, “Aakhri Jang”, Khuda Bol Raha Hai”, "Adhuri Kahani", “Quran Ka Matloob Insaan”, “Bus Yehi Dil”, “Hadees e Dil” and “Wohi Rehguzar”. His other books include travelogues, “Khol Ankh Zameen Dekh” , “Sair-e-Natamaam” and "Wohi Rahguzar" based on his travelling to various countries including, Australia, Turkey, Singapore, Thailand, Malaysia, Sri Lanka, Saudi Arabia, Canada and USA.

Novels 
 Jab Zindagi Shuru Hogi (When Life Begins) – Part 1 (This book has been translated in many local and foreign languages including English, Hindi, Bangla, Pashto and Sindhi)
 Qasam Us Waqt Ki (Testimony of Time) - Part 2
 Akhri Jang (The Last War) - Part 3
 Khuda Bol Raha Hai (God is Speaking) - Part 4
 Adhuri Kahani (The Incomplete Story) - Part 5

Travelogues
 Sair-e-Natamaam (The Unfinished Visit)
 Khol Ankh Zameen Dekh (Open your eyes, Look at the World)
 Wohi Rehguzar (The Same Path)

Others books 
 Quran Ka Matloob Insaan (The human wanted by the Quran)
 Bas Yahi Dil (Only such a Heart)
 Hadees-e-Dil (Words of a Heart)
 Mulaqaat (The Meeting)
 Teesri Roshni (The Third Light) (Reply on the criticism of Jab Zindagi Shuru Hogi)
 Hikmat Ki Batein (Words of Wisdom) (A books on selected quotations)
 Mazameen-e-Quran (The Essays in Quran) (about topics of Quran - under progress)

Projects 
 Quran Ka Matloob Insaan
 Wajood-e-Bari Talah (Evidences on existence of Almightly)
 Aakhirat Kay Dalael (Evidences of Life Hereafter)
 Aakhirat Ki Zindagi (The Hereafter Life)
 Evidences of “Tauheed (Oneness of God)” 
 Evidences of “Risalat (Prophethood)” 
 Course on Fasting
 Stress Management
 Course on “Shariat” (Planned)

References

External links 
 
 inzaar.org

21st-century Urdu-language writers
1969 births
University of Karachi alumni
Living people